Liv Monica Bargem Stubholt (born 24 July 1961) is a Norwegian lawyer and former politician for the Norwegian Centre Party. She currently serves as a partner in law firm Selmer AS and former industry executive as Senior Vice President Strategy and Communication in Kvaerner ASA - a listed EPC company in the petroleum industry.

Education
Stubholt graduated as cand.jur. from the University of Oslo in 1987.

Career

Stoltenberg government
When the second cabinet Stoltenberg assumed office following the 2005 elections, Stubholt was appointed State Secretary in the Ministry of Foreign Affairs. In 2007, she was appointed State Secretary in the Ministry of Petroleum and Energy.

Post politics
Following her time in politics, Stubholt has a long career as a business lawyer including as partner in law firm BA-HR. She serves a trusted advisor to a number of international companies invested in Norway. She joined Aker ASA as investment director for Aker Clean Carbon in 2009. Stubholt was acting CEO in Aker Seafoods in 2010.

In December 2021, she was elected to the board of Gigante Salmon AS.

Other activities
 International Crisis Group (ICG), Board of Trustees (since 2012)
 Board member, Norsk Hydro ASA
 Board member Norwegian - German Chamber of Commerce in Oslo
 Member of the advisory board of Frithjof Nansens Institute
 Former chairman of the board of Aker Clean Carbon AS
 Former member of the board of Statnett SF
 Formerly on the Committee of State Secretaries on International Strategy for Social Corporate Responsibility;Norway 
 Formerly on the Committee of State Secretaries on Polar Affairs;Norway
 Former member of the Disciplinary Council for the Oslo branch of the Norwegian Bar Association
 Former Supervisory Committee Anti-Money Laundering (appointed by the Ministry of Finance)

References

External links
Regjeringen.no biography 
Akerasa.com 

1961 births
Living people
Centre Party (Norway) politicians
Norwegian state secretaries
University of Oslo alumni
Norwegian women state secretaries